Broadmeadows railway station is located on the Craigieburn line in Victoria, Australia. It serves the northern Melbourne suburb of Broadmeadows, and opened on 1 February 1873.

The Melbourne–Sydney standard gauge line runs to the east of the station, and south of the station, towards Flinders Street, the Albion–Jacana freight line branches westward from the main line, providing an alternative route into Melbourne to the suburban lines via Essendon.

Train stabling facilities are located to the north of the station.

History
The railway past the site of Broadmeadows station opened in 1872, as part of the North East line to School House Lane. At the time of opening, the village of Broadmeadows was located some distance from the station, becoming known as "Old Broadmeadows", and now Westmeadows. It was not until post-World War II housing development that the gap between the old town and the station was filled.

The station was initially provided with a -long platform, a goods siding and shed, and a passing loop for trains on the single track. That early station was closer to Camp Road than the station today. In 1878, a permanent station building was provided, along with a longer platform, all on the present site. In 1885, the line was duplicated, and a second platform was provided, of timber construction.

In 1920, sheds and sidings for bagged wheat were provided, to handle the overflow from the Port of Williamstown. The sidings and sheds have since been removed.

In 1919, electric train services between the city and Essendon were inaugurated, with electrification extended to Broadmeadows in 1921. However, Essendon remained the terminus of most suburban services, with a shuttle service operating beyond until 1925, and all day through services to Broadmeadows not provided until 1941.

The level crossing at Camp Road was initially protected by hand-operated gates, with boom barriers provided in 1961. In 1978, the level crossing was replaced with the current overpass. Barry Road also had a level crossing, which was replaced by the current overpass in the late 1950s, as part of the construction of the standard gauge line. The Riggall Street overpass, about a kilometre north of Broadmeadows, was provided in 1974-1975. In 1971, the current underpass, which is located at the Up end of the station, was provided.

In 1889, a lever frame in the signal box was installed, and was replaced in 1929, when the Albion-Jacana freight line opened. In 1961, a signal panel was provided at the station. In 1965, mechanical signalling along the line to Essendon was abolished, but it was not until 2000 that solid-state interlocking was provided. In 2007, the control centre was moved to Craigieburn, as part of the extension of suburban electrification to Craigieburn.

The original 1878 station building was demolished in 1988, and was replaced by a new structure, which was opened on 16 March 1990 by then Transport Minister Jim Kennan, as part of a commercial development of the site. On 21 March 1996, Broadmeadows was upgraded to a Premium Station.

In 2007, suburban electric services were extended to Craigieburn. As part of these works, the siding closest to the standard gauge line (Siding "B") was abolished and removed in February of that year.

In late 2009, a third platform on the parallel standard gauge line was provided, as part of the North East Rail Revitalisation Project, under which the broad gauge line to Albury was converted to standard gauge and a standard gauge V/Line Albury service was inaugurated.

During World War II, an Army siding was provided to Broadstore, located to the north-east of the station. It opened on 12 October 1942, and remained in place until 1982. However, the at-grade crossing was not abolished until 1989, and the track was not lifted until after 1991. The Broadstore branch was a single un-electrified track, extending in an easterly direction for approximately 1.6 kilometres and terminating at the Maygar Barracks on Camp Road. At one time, it also had a further branch that served a migrant hostel. The Broadstore branch line is marked on maps of the Victorian Railways in 1950, 1960, 1970, and 1980, terminating at a station marked "Broadstore".

Incidents and accidents
On 14 September 1960, steam locomotive R755, which was hauling a passenger service from Numurkah, was involved in a collision when it rear-ended an Albury – Melbourne goods service at 40 mph (65 km/h). The goods service had been detaching a number of livestock wagons and was given clearance to enter the Albion–Jacana freight line. However, the passenger service, which had been waiting at Craigieburn, was also given clearance. The goods service split when it was moving forward, delaying the train, when the collision occurred. After the accident, R755 was re-railed and moved to the Broadstore branch line. The locomotive was damaged beyond repair and was scrapped in November of that year.

On 3 February 1979, a Numurkah – Geelong bound grain train derailed as it was entering the Albion–Jacana freight line. Eight wagons derailed, and the overhead wires and stanchions were also brought down.

On 14 November 1996, two Comeng train sets collided between Broadmeadows and Jacana, injuring 13 people. It occurred after a city-bound train collided with a stationary Broadmeadows bound train. Two carriages derailed in the collision.

On 3 February 2003, an unattended Comeng set, led by carriage 394M, rolled away from Broadmeadows station, and ran as far as Spencer Street station, where it collided with V/Line locomotive N463, which was leading a Bacchus Marsh-bound train.

Platforms and services
Broadmeadows has three side platforms. Platforms 1 and 2 are served by broad gauge Craigieburn line suburban trains, and V/Line Seymour and Shepparton line services. Platform 3 is served by standard gauge V/Line Albury and NSW TrainLink Sydney trains. A number of Metro Train services commence and terminate at Broadmeadows during the peak-hours.

Platform 1:
  all stations services to Flinders Street
  V/Line services to Southern Cross (set down only)
  V/Line services to Southern Cross (set down only)

Platform 2:
  all stations services to Craigieburn
  V/Line services to Seymour (pick up only)
  V/Line services to Shepparton (pick up only)

Platform 3:
  V/Line services to Albury (pick up only) and Southern Cross (set down only)
  NSW TrainLink XPT services to Sydney Central (pick up only) and Southern Cross (set down only)

Transport links
CDC Melbourne operates two bus routes to and from Broadmeadows station, under contract to Public Transport Victoria:
 : to Moonee Ponds Junction
 : to Roxburgh Park station

Dysons operates four bus routes via Broadmeadows station, under contract to Public Transport Victoria:
 : to Somerset Estate (Campbellfield)
 : to Upfield station
 : to Craigieburn North
 : Roxburgh Park station – Pascoe Vale station

Kastoria Bus Lines operates one route to and from Broadmeadows station, under contract to Public Transport Victoria:
 : to Craigieburn station

Kinetic Melbourne operates two SmartBus routes via Broadmeadows station, under contract to Public Transport Victoria:
  : Frankston station – Melbourne Airport
  : Chelsea station – Airport West

Ventura Bus Lines operates two routes to and from Broadmeadows station, under contract to Public Transport Victoria:
  : to Craigieburn (Saturday and Sunday mornings only)
  : to Melbourne CBD (Queen Street) (Saturday and Sunday mornings only)

Gallery

References

External links

Premium Melbourne railway stations
Railway stations in Melbourne
Railway stations in Australia opened in 1873
Broadmeadows, Victoria
Railway stations in the City of Hume